Ronald Thomas is the name of:
Ronald Thomas (politician) (born 1929), British Labour Party politician
Ronald Thomas (cellist) (born 1954), American cellist
R. S. Thomas (1913–2000), Welsh poet and Anglican clergyman
Ronald Thomas (tennis) (1888–1936), Australian Olympic tennis player
Ronald Thomas (cricketer) (1915–1987), Australian cricketer
Ronald R. Thomas (born 1949), American academic administrator

See also
Ron Thomas (disambiguation)
Ronnie Thomas (born 1955), NASCAR driver